Emmanuel Samba Zumakpeh is a Ghanaian politician and was the member of parliament for Nadowli South constituency in the Upper West Region of Ghana. He was a member of parliament in the 1st, 2nd, and 3rd parliaments of the 4th republic of Ghana.

Early life and education 
Zumakpeh was born in June 1955 in Wa. He had his secondary education at Tamale Secondary School and obtained his Teachers' Training Certificate (Certificate A) from the Wa Training College. He later attended the University of Ghana, where he received his bachelor of Arts degree and McMaster University in Hamilton, Canada, where he was awarded his Master of Arts degree.

Career 
Zumakpeh is a teacher by profession. He is also a Ghanaian politician.

Politics 
Zumakpeh is a member of the National Democratic Congress. He was elected into the first parliament of the fourth republic of Ghana on 7 January 1993 after he was pronounced winner at the 1992 Ghanaian parliamentary election held on 29 December 1992.

He was subsequently elected as the member of parliament for Nadwoli South constituency in the Upper West region in the 2nd and 3rd parliament of the 4th republic of Ghana.

2000 General Elections 
Zumakpeh was also elected as the member of parliament for the Nadwoli South constituency in the 2000 Ghanaian general elections. He was elected on the ticket of the National Democratic Congress. His constituency was a part of the 7 parliamentary seats out of 12 seats won by the National Democratic Congress in that election for the Upper West Region.

The National Democratic Congress won a minority total of 92 parliamentary seats out of 200 seats in the 3rd parliament of the 4th republic of Ghana. He was elected with 7,075 total valid votes cast. This was equivalent to 65.50% of the total valid votes cast. He was elected over Richard Dunee of the Peoples National Convention and Ye-Anyi Albert Dakura of the New Patriotic Party.

These obtained 2,603 and 1,129respectively out of the total valid votes cast. These were equivalent to 24.10% and 10.40% respectively of total valid votes cast.

Personal life 
Zumakpeh is a Christian.

References 

Living people
Ghanaian MPs 2001–2005
21st-century Ghanaian politicians
McMaster University alumni
Ghanaian educators
University of Ghana alumni
National Democratic Congress (Ghana) politicians
Ghanaian MPs 1997–2001
Government ministers of Ghana
Ghanaian Christians
People from Upper West Region
1955 births
Tamale Senior High School alumni